Zosimus the Hermit was an ascetic who resided in the wilds of Cilicia and Palestine in the 3rd century AD. 

Zosimus was tortured during the persecution of the Church under Roman Emperor Diocletian but persevered in his Christian faith. After being tortured he was left miraculously unharmed which led to the conversion of Zosimus' guard Athanasius who accepted the Christian faith and baptism.

Eventually both Zosimus and Athanasius were released. Zozimus traveled by camel, and later by wind to a place called the "Abode of the Blessed." The Abode was a mountain hermitage far from human society in Palestine. When he arrived, he saw a wall of clouds which he was lifted across by two trees.  At the abode he found a group of Rechabites. Zosimus lived there for 40 years. While there he abstained from wine, bread, and social interactions. Afterwards, he left to spread the Rechabite teachings. In order to stop him, the Devil and several demons tortured him for 40 days. However, Zosimus banished the demons and lived on. During Zosimus's life he would meet a penitent at the Jordan river. It is commonly accepted that much of the story surrounding Zosimus is fantasy.

Saint Zosimus the Hermit and Saint Athanasius his disciple are commemorated on 4 January by the Eastern Orthodox and Byzantine Catholic Churches.

See also
Story of Zosimus

References

Hermits in the Roman Empire
Saints from Roman Anatolia
3rd-century Christian saints
Diocletianic Persecution